Trample the Weak, Hurdle the Dead is the fourth studio album by American death metal band Skinless. It is the only album to feature vocalist Jason Keyser, as well as the band's only album without vocalist Sherwood Webber IV.

The album art features first person point view of Noah Carpenter wearing a gas mask pointing a rifle at them, perhaps even stabbing the onlooker with an attached bayonet.

Track listing
All songs written by Jason Keyser and Noah Carpenter.

Notes
The first track, "Overlord," starts with a sample from Caesar's climactic speech from Conquest of the Planet of the Apes. The sample at the start of the next track, "A Unilateral Disgust," is from Hot Shots! Part Deux. The sample at the start of "Trample the Weak, Hurdle the Dead" is from Patton. The fifth sample is at the end of track seven, "Execution of Reason," which is from Mystery Science Theater 3000 - The Touch of Satan episode. The tour in support of the album included headlining the final Metal for the Brain Festival in Canberra, Australia.

Line up
Jason Keyser - Vocals
Joe Keyser - Bass
Noah Carpenter - Guitar
Bob Beaulac - Drums

References

2006 albums
Skinless albums